Jacobus "Jappie" van Dijk (born 29 September 1944) is a former speed skater from the Netherlands. He competed at the  1972 Winter Olympics in the 500 m and finished in 32nd place. A year later he won the national allround title.

Personal records

Tournament overview

 ISSL = International Speed Skating League
source:

References

1944 births
Living people
Dutch male speed skaters
Olympic speed skaters of the Netherlands
Speed skaters at the 1972 Winter Olympics
Sportspeople from Friesland
People from Gaasterlân-Sleat